Willms Buhse (born 3 November 1970 in Langenhagen, Germany) is a German entrepreneur, author, speaker and consultant based in Hamburg. His work focuses on digital leadership and digital transformation, covering also the people-centric aspects of change management and organizational transformation using multiple agile methods like OKR (objectives and key results). In 2006 and 2007 Buhse was named one of the "Top 50 Most influential People in Mobile Entertainment".

Willms Buhse has developed the VOPA management model for dealing with VUCA forces. VOPA is an acronym made up of the German terms for networking, openness, participation, agility. This leadership approach describes the extent to which corporate and management culture must change in the sense of increased openness, networking of channels, resources and responsibilities.

In 2009 Buhse founded digital transformation consulting company  and currently works there as CEO. Customers include Allianz, Axel Springer, Bosch, DAK, Daimler, Deutsche Telekom, DHL, Evonik, IBM, Microsoft, Nestlé, Otto, Lufthansa and R+V.

Prior to that he was executive director at CoreMedia since 2003. From 2002 to 2006, he also served as vice-chair for the Open Mobile Alliance working on open standards for mobile.

Prior he held several positions at Bertelsmann AG in Gütersloh, Hamburg and New York City. There he co-founded Digital World Services. He worked on projects with AOL, AT&T, Napster and Universal. Before, he was a consultant in technology and strategy projects at the German top-management consultancy group Roland Berger Strategy Consultants and advised companies like Volkswagen and Deutsche Bahn.

Willms Buhse holds a patent for a system and method for the distribution of digital goods.

Buhse holds degrees in industrial engineering (Dipl.-Ing.) and in management sciences (Dipl.-Oec.) from the Leibniz University Hannover (Germany) and Madrid (Spain) and a PhD in economics from the Technical University of Munich.

Buhse is author, co-author and editor of seven books and has been speaking at over 100 conferences and panels on the effect of digital Transformation on different industries.

He lives in Hamburg with his wife and children.

Bibliography

Buhse, Willms et al. (2021). Whitepaper: Unsere Sicht auf OKRs – Veränderung für das neue Normal. (online)
Buhse, Willms. (2020). Internes Strategie-Desaster: Die IT wartet auf Anforderungen durch den Vorstand, die dieser gar nicht liefern kann – Objectives und Key Results (OKR) können die Lösung sein. Springer Wirtschaftsinformatik & Management. (online)
Buhse, Willms. (2020). Reinhard Mohn – der Management-Vordenker für Zeiten Digitaler Transformation. CreatingCorporateCultures. (online)
Buhse, Willms. (2019). Was braucht es für eine erfolgreiche digitale Transformation? CreatingCorporateCulture. (online)
Buhse, Willms. (2019). Digitale Transformation: 2019 wird das Jahr der Ergebnisorientierung. Trend Report. (online)
Böing, Matthias; Buhse, Willms; Röttger, Nikolaus; Christian; Schranner. (2018). ZEIT Akademie Business – Digital Leadership: Führen in Zeiten des digitalen Wandels. ZEIT Akademie Business. (online)
Buhse, Willms (2017). Die Start-up-Ära ist vorbei – Gastbeitrag von Internet-Ikone Willms Buhse. WirtschaftsWoche. (online)Buhse, Willms (2016). So sieht die Beratung der Zukunft aus. Wirtschaftswoche. (online)
Buhse, Willms. (2015). Deutsche Vertriebsteams sind Digitalamateure. Vertriebsmanager, Juli 2015. (online)
Buhse, Willms. (2015). Fünf Tipps für einen professionellen Auftritt auf Xing und LinkedIn. PR-Journal, 15. Juli. (online)
Buhse, Willms. (2015). Digitale Transformation: Warum Branchenkenner nicht weiterhelfen. WirtschaftsWoche, 13. Februar. (online)
Buhse, Willms. (2014). Management by Internet – Neue Führungsmodelle für Unternehmen in Zeiten der digitalen Transformation. Kulmbach: Plassen Verlag. 
Buhse, Willms. (2014). Management in der Digitalen Transformation: Nullen oder Einsen? Karrierebibel, 05. Juli. (online)
Buhse, Willms (2014). Der digitale Manager. Capital, Juni. (online)
Buhse, Willms. (2014). Digital Leadership bei der Robert Bosch GmbH. Wissensmanagement – Das Magazin für Führungskräfte, o.Jg.(6), 14–15. (online) 
Buhse, Willms. (2013). Social-Business-Plattformen: 10.000 Mitarbeiter, die ihr Know-how mit Kollegen teilen. Oder: Wie Bayer Material Science seine Wissenssilos abschaffte. Management-Blog der WirtschaftsWoche, 18. April. (online)
Buhse, Willms. (2013). Was Manager von Amanda Palmer lernen können. Ein Gastbeitrag von Willms Buhse zum Leader-in-the-Digital-World-Award 2013. Management-Blog der WirtschaftsWoche, 1. März. (online)
Buhse, Willms. (2012). Die Social-Business-Herausforderung: "Das ist eben etwas Neues" reicht nicht als Begründung. Management-Blog der WirtschaftsWoche, 24. Juli. (online)
Buhse, Willms. (2012). Warum Lida-Award-Siegerin Cordelia Krooß ihren Preis verdient hat. Management-Blog der WirtschaftsWoche, 15. März. (online) 
Buhse, Willms. (2012). Welche Eigenschaften brauchen Leader? Management-Blog der WirtschaftsWoche, 3. März. (online)
Buhse, Willms. (2011). Enterprise 2.0 im Management – Frischzellenkur für Sales & Services. In Frank Keuper & Bernhard Hogenschurz (Hrsg.), Professionelles Sales & Service Management: Vorsprung durch konsequente Kundenorientierung (2. Auflage) (S. 405–417). Wiesbaden: Gabler-Verlag. 
Buhse, Willms. (2010). eRecruitig: Digital Natives stellen konventionelle Unternehmensstrukturen auf die Probe. PR-Journal, 23. September. (online) 
Buhse, Willms & Reppesgaard, Lars. (2010). SharePoint 2010 oder wie Anzugträger und Kapuzenpullis zusammen arbeiten: Collaboration mit SharePoint 2010. Hamburg: CreateSpace Independent Publishing Platform. 
Buhse, Willms & Stamer, Sören. (2010). Enterprise 2.0: Die Kunst, loszulassen. Berlin: Rhombos-Verlag. 
Buhse, Willms & Reinhard, Ulrike. (2009). DNAdigital – Wenn Anzugträger auf Kapuzenpullis treffen: Die Kunst aufeinander zuzugehen. Neckarhausen: whois verlags- & vertriebsgesellschaft. 
Buhse, Willms. (2009). Management by OpenSpaces. In BITKOM, KnowTech: Geteiltes Wissen ist doppeltes Wissen. 
Buhse, Willms & Stamer, Sören. (2008). Enterprise 2.0: The Art of Letting Go. New York: iUniverse. 
Buhse, Willms. (2008). Enterprise 2.0 – alter Wein in neuen Schläuchen? In BITKOM, Enterprise 2.0 – auf der Suche nach dem CEO 2.0. Neue Unternehmensphilosophie gewinnt Konturen (S. 5–6). (online)
Buhse, Willms & Schürmann, Hendrik. (2008). Von starren Hierarchien zu flexiblen Unternehmensnetzwerken. Wissensmanagement – Das Magazin für Führungskräfte, o.Jg.(7). (online)
Buhse, Willms. (2008). Web 2.0 für Unternehmen: Essentiell oder trivial – und warum überhaupt? Computerwoche, Heft 7.
Buhse, Willms. (2008). Firmen umwerben die Web-Generation. Computerwoche, o.Jg.(31–32), 22ff.
Buhse, Willms & Dornis, Axel. (2008). Enterprise 2.0 – das Ende von Wissen am Fliessband. Wissenmanagement – Das Magazin für Führungskräfte, o.J.(8).
Buhse, Willms. (2007). Fallstudie: Enterprise 2.0 – Die Symbiose aus Unternehmenskultur und technischer Plattform. In Michael Koch & Alexander Richter, Enterprise 2.0: Einführung und erfolgreicher Einsatz von Social Software in Unternehmen (S. 153–158). München: Oldenbourg Wissenschaftsverlag. 
Buhse, Willms & van der Meer, Jan. (2007). The Open Mobile Alliance Digital Rights Management. Standards in a Nutshell. Signal Processing Magazine, IEE, 24(1), 140–143. 
Buhse, Willms. (2004). Digital Rights Management for Interoperable Mobile Services. How the Open Mobile Alliance enables increased revenues for handset vendors and mobile operators. Wireless Technology Magazine, 06. Oktober. (online)
Buhse, Willms. (2004). Wettbewerbsstrategien im Umfeld von Darknet und Digital Rights Management: Szenarien und Erlösmodelle für Onlinemusik. Wiesbaden: Deutscher Universitäts-Verlag. 
Buhse, Willms. (2003). Business Models for Mobile Content in the Context of Digital Rights Management. In Rolf Auf der Maur & Marc Jacobson (Hrgs.), Music Unleashed: Legal Implications of Mobile Music Distribution (S. 43–58). Apeldoorn: MAKLU Publishers. 
Buhse, Willms & Wenzel, Amélie. (2003). Creating a framework for Business Models for Digital Content – Mobile Music as Case Study. In Eberhard Becker, Willms Buhse, Dirk Günnewig & Niels Rump (Hrsg.), Digital Rights Management. Technological, Economic, Legal and Public Aspects (S. 271–287). Berlin: Springer-Verlag. 
Buhse, Willms. (2002). The Role of Digital Rights Management as a Solution for Market Uncertainties for Mobile Music. The International Journal on Media Management 4(3), 172–179.
Buhse, Willms & Thiem, Henning. (2000). Kooperationen entlang der Wertschöpfungskette in der Musikindustrie: Status quo und Implikationen durch Electronic Commerce. In Claus Steinle, Bernd Eggers & Henning Thiem (Hrsg.), Vitalisierung – das Management der neuen Lebendigkeit (S. 174–191). Frankfurt am Main: Frankfurter Allgemeine Zeitung Verlag.

References

External links
Harvard video interview "Enterprise 2.0 – The Art Of Letting Go" 
Homepage of book "The Art Of Letting Go"
Homepage of Willms Buhse
Homepage of company doubleYUU
Interview with magazine Computerwoche (in German)
"The profession of a manager is a discontinued model": Interview with daily newspaper Abendblatt (in German)
"Quiet Quitting: Why Employers Have Sleepless Nights": Op-ed by Willms Buhse for financial newspaper Wirtschaftswoche (in German)

1970 births
Living people
Businesspeople from Hamburg
Business speakers
Technical University of Munich alumni
People from Hanover Region